The 1953 New South Wales Grand Prix was a motor race held at the Gnoo Blas Motor Racing Circuit, Orange, New South Wales, Australia on 5 October 1953. The race, which was organised by the Australian Sporting Car Club, was contested over a distance of 100 miles (161 km). It was staged on a handicap basis with prize money allocated for the first ten handicap positions and additional prizes offered for the first three scratch placings.

The handicap race was won by Jack Robinson (Jaguar XK120 Special) whilst the Grand Prix title was awarded to Jack Brabham (Cooper Bristol) who had set the fastest race time.

Handicap results

+ : The Grand Prix title was awarded to Jack Brabham who had set the fastest race time.

Notes
 Race distance: 28 laps, 100 miles (161 km)
 Starters: 24
 Finishers: Unknown
 Scratch starter: Jack Brabham
 Race winner's race time: 1 h 20 min 3 s, (approximately 78 mph, 125 km/h)
 Fastest Time: Jack Brabham, 1 h 17 min 16 s

References

New South Wales Grand Prix
Motorsport at Gnoo Blas
New South Wales Grand Prix
October 1953 sports events in Australia